Paul Emsley (born 25 August 1947) is a British artist who worked in South Africa until 1996 and is now resident in Bradford-on-Avon, Wiltshire, England. He is a former lecturer at the Stellenbosch University and the 2007 winner of the BP Portrait Award for portrait painting. His work can be found in most public collections in South Africa, The National Portrait Gallery London and The British Museum. He is known for his large detailed images of people, animals and flowers. There was a major retrospective of his work in 2012 at the Sasol Art Gallery in Stellenbosch. He is represented in the UK by the Redfern Gallery and in South Africa by Everard Read. Emsley's portrait of the Princess of Wales is on permanent display at the National Portrait Gallery in London. Other notable portraits include Nelson Mandela, Sir V. S. Naipaul, Michael Simpson and William Kentridge.

Biography
Paul Emsley was born in Glasgow on 25 August 1947. Having grown up in South Africa, he moved to the UK in 1996, and currently resides in Bradford-upon-Avon, although retaining an ongoing presence in South Africa. In 2012 he was commissioned to paint the official Portrait of Catherine, Duchess of Cambridge, which he completed in three and a half months.

Artist statement
“I have always loved drawing. The dryness of the paper and the chalk demand precision and exactness. It quickly exposes one’s shortcomings allowing no room for clever tricks. I try to emphasise the singularity and silence of the form. By a careful balancing of tones I explore the way in which light and shade fall across the subject. By creating a settled half-light I try to transform the existence of the object from the ordinary to something more profound.”

Awards
 UWE. Drawing Prize. RWA Autumn Exhibition. 2008
 BP Portrait Award. First Prize. 2007
 Silver Award for Works on Paper. British Interior Design Association. Art London 2005
 UWE Drawing Prize. RWA Autumn Exhibition 2004
 3rd Prize; Singer & Friedlander Sunday Times Watercolour Competition 2003
 1st Prize; Singer & Friedlander Sunday Times Watercolour Competition 2002
 3rd Prize; Singer & Friedlander Sunday Times Watercolour Competition 2001
 Commended; RWA 1st Painting Open 2001
 Bovis-Architects Journal Special Award; Royal Academy Summer Exhibition 2000
 Merit Award; Standard Bank National Drawing Competition 1987

References

External links
Official website
Paul Emsley artist page at BRUNDYN + GONSALVES
Paul Emsley at the National Portrait Gallery
A video of the Paul Emsley Retrospective at Sasol Art Gallery, Stellenbosch

British painters
British male painters
Living people
1947 births
People from Bradford-on-Avon
BP Portrait Award winners